This article contains a list of all matches played during the 2018 Super Rugby regular season.

Round 1

Round 1 consisted of matches in the South African Conference only.

Round 2

Round 3

Round 4

Round 5

Round 6

Round 7

Round 8

Round 9

Round 10

Round 11

Round 12

Round 13

Round 14

Round 15

Round 16

Round 16 consisted of matches in the Australian and New Zealand Conferences only.

Round 17

Round 18

Round 19

See also

 2018 Super Rugby season

References

2018 Super Rugby season
Super Rugby lists